Rebecca Spindler (born in Melbourne) is the head of science and conservation at non-profit conservation organisation Bush Heritage Australia. She previously was the manager of research and conservation at Taronga Conservation Society Australia, in the New South Wales Office of Environment and Heritage (OEH).

Background

Spindler's PhD on marsupial reproduction at the University of Melbourne led her to the Smithsonian Conservation Biology Institute. There, Rebecca managed a laboratory and integrated reproduction, her own area of expertise with other disciplines of science to conserve species. She spent five giant panda breeding seasons in the Wolong Nature Reserve, coordinating the Smithsonian's Giant Panda and Wild China Programmes. During this same period she established the Neotropical Carnivore Initiative and with colleagues throughout the Americas, embarking on a multidisciplinary program aimed at improving the health, reproduction and conservation of jaguars. In 2007, she joined the team at Taronga as manager of research and conservation, coordinating and facilitating the research of the zoo science team investigating wildlife health, ecology, behaviour, reproduction, genetics and nutrition. Spindler also helped Taronga protect species and their habitats through the Taronga Field Conservation Grants.

Publications

Total citations: 323. H index: 10

Peer-reviewed papers

Spindler R.E., M.B. Renfree and D.K. Gardner.  1995.  Metabolic assessment of wallaby blastocysts during embryonic diapause and subsequent reactivation.  Reproduction, Fertility and Development 7, 1157–1162. 
Spindler R.E., M.B. Renfree and D.K. Gardner.  1996.  Carbohydrate uptake by quiescent and reactivating mouse blastocysts.  Journal of Experimental Zoology 276, 132–137. 
Spindler R.E., M.B. Renfree, G. Shaw and D.K. Gardner.  1998.  Reactivating tammar wallaby blastocysts oxidise glucose.  Biology of Reproduction 58, 1425–1431. 
Spindler R.E., M.B. Renfree, G. Shaw and D.K. Gardner.  1998.  Reactivating tammar wallaby blastocysts oxidise fatty acids and amino acids.  Journal of Reproduction and Fertility 115, 79–86. 
Spindler R.E., M.B. Renfree and D.K. Gardner.  1998.  Mouse embryos used as a bioassay to determine control of marsupial embryonic diapause.  Journal of Experimental Zoology 283, 590–599. 
Spindler R.E. and D.E. Wildt.  1999.  Circannual variations in intraovarian oocyte but not epididymal sperm quality in the domestic cat.  Biology of Reproduction 61, 188–194. 
Spindler R.E., B. Pukazhenthi and D.E. Wildt.  2000.  Oocyte metabolism predicts the development of cat embryos to blastocyst in vitro.  Molecular Reproduction and Development 56, 163–171. 
Huang, Y., D.S. Li, H.M. Zhang, J. Du, G.Q. Zhang, P.Y Wang, J.G. Howard, R. Spindler, B. Durrant and M.A. Olson.  2000.  Electroejaculation and semen cryopreservation in giant pandas.  Journal of Sichuan Teachers College 3, 238–243.
Huang, Y., DS. Li, J. Du, P.Y. Wang, H.M. Zhang, J.G. Howard and R. Spindler.  2001.  Study for freezing semen of giant pandas.  Chinese Journal of Zoology 36, 25–29.  
Harnal, V.K., R. Spindler, S.L. Monfort, B. Pukazhenthi, D.M. Bird, and D.E. Wildt.  2001.  Sperm capacitation in vitro in the Eld's deer.  Theriogenology 56, 399–413. 
Spindler R.E. and D.E. Wildt.  2002. Quality and age of companion felid embryos modulate enhanced development by group culture.  Biology of Reproduction 66, 167–73. 
Axner E., B. Pukazhenthi, D.E.Wildt, C. Linde-Forsberg and R.E. Spindler.  2002.  Creatine phosphokinase domestic cat epididymal spermatozoa.  Molecular, Reproduction and Development 61, 1–6. 
Pukazhenthi, B, R. Spindler, D.E. Wildt, L.M. Bush and J.G. Howard. 2002. Osmotic properties of spermatozoa from felids producing different proportions of pleiomorphisms: Influence of adding and removing cryoprotectant.  Cryobiology 44, 288–300. 
Olson, M., H. Yan, D. Li, R. Spindler, J. Howard, H. Zhang, and B. Durrant.  2003. Assessment of motility, acrosomal integrity, and viability of giant panda Ailuropoda melanoleuca sperm following short-term storage at 4C. Zoo Biology 22:529-544. 
Spindler, R.E., Y. Huang, J.G. Howard, P. Wang, H. Zhang, G. Zhang and D.E. Wildt.  2004.  Acrosomal integrity and capacitation are not influenced by sperm cryopreservation in the giant panda.  Reproduction 127, 547–56. http://www.reproduction-online.org/content/127/5/547.short
Huang Yan, Wang Pengyan, Spindler, Rebecca E., Howard, JoGayle, Zhang Hemin, Wildt, David E.  2004.  Study on the influence of post-thaw motility on giant panda cryopreserved sperm by thawing rate and pentoxyfiline in vitro.  Acta Theriologica Sinica 24: 286–292.
Spindler, R.E., Crichton, E.G., Agca, Y., Loskutoff, N., Critser, J, Gardner, D.K., Wildt, D.E. 2006.  Improved felid embryo development by group culture is maintained with heterospecific companions.  Theriogenology. 66:  82–92. 
Pukazhenthi, B., Laroe, D., Crosier, A., Bush, L.M., Spindler, R., Pelican, K., Bush, M., Howard, J.G., Wildt, D.E. 2006.  Challenges in cryopreservation of clouded leopard (Neofelis nebulosa) spermatozoa.  Theriogenology 66:1790-6. 
Spindler, R.E., Y. Huang, J.G. Howard, P. Wang, H. Zhang, G. Zhang and D.E. Wildt.  2006.  Giant panda sperm decondensation is not influenced by cryopreservation  Reproduction, Fertility and Development 18: 767-775. http://www.publish.csiro.au/?paper=RD06030
Songsasen, N., Spindler, R.E. and Wildt, D.E. 2007 Requirement for, and patterns of, pyruvate and glutamine metabolism in the domestic dog oocyte in vitro, Molecular Reproduction and Development 74: 870–877. 
Hermes, R., Göritz, F., Portas, T.J., Bryant, B.R., Kelly, J.M., Maclellan, L.J., Keeley, T., Schwarzenberger, F., Walzer, C., Schnorrenberg, A., Spindler, R.E., Saragusty, J., Kaandorp, S., Hildebrandt, T.B. 2009.  Ovarian superstimulation, transrectal ultrasound-guided oocyte recovery, and IVF in rhinoceros.  Theriogenology 72:959-68. 
Pelican, K.M., Spindler, R.E., Pukazhenthi, B.S., Wildt, D.E., Ottinger, M.A., Howard, J. 2010.  Progestin Exposure Before Gonadotropin Stimulation Improves Embryo Development after In Vitro Fertilization in the Domestic Cat.  Biology of Reproduction 83: 558–567. http://www.biolreprod.org/content/83/4/558.short
Aitken-Palmer C, Hou R, Burrell C, Zhang Z, Wang C, Spindler R, Wildt DE, Ottinger MA, Howard J. 2012 Protracted reproductive seasonality in the male giant panda (Ailuropoda melanoleuca) reflected by patterns in androgen profiles, ejaculate characteristics, and selected behaviors. Biol Reprod. 86:195 
Hagedorn M, van Oppen MJ, Carter V, Henley M, Abrego D, Puill-Stephan E, Negri A, Heyward A, MacFarlane D, Spindler R. 2012 First frozen repository for the Great Barrier Reef coral created. Cryobiology. 65:157-8 
Herrmann EA, Herrin KV, Gleen W, Davies P, Stapley R, Stebbings V, Wiszniewski J, Spindler R, Faichney GJ, Chaves AV 2013 Partial Replacement of an Artificial Nectar Diet With Native Browse for Feather-Tail Gliders (Acrobates pygmaeus) in Captivity. Zoo Biol. 32:394-9

Book chapters
Howard, J.G., Z. Zhang, D. Li, Y. Huang, M. Zhang, R. Hou, Z. Ye, G. Li, J. Zhang, S. Huang, H. Zhang, J. Zhang, R. E. Spindler and D. E. Wildt.  2006.  Male reproductive biology in giant pandas in breeding programs in China.  In:  The Giant Panda: Biology, Veterinary Medicine and Management (eds., D.E. Wildt, A. Zhang, H. Zhang, D.L. Janssen and S. Ellis), in press.  Cambridge University Press, Cambridge.
Howard, J.G., Y. Huang, P. Wang, D. Li, G. Zhang, R. Hou, Z. Zhang, B.S. Durrant, R.E. Spindler, H. Zhang, A. Zhang and D.E. Wildt.  2006.  Role and efficiency of artificial insemination and genome resource banking. In:  The Giant Panda: Biology, Veterinary Medicine and Management (eds., D. E. Wildt, A. Zhang, H. Zhang, D.L. Janssen and S. Ellis).  Cambridge University Press, Cambridge.
Morato R. G., Queiroz V. d. S. and Spindler R. E. 2007 Importância do banco de amostras biológicas e do manejo em cativeiro na canservação de carnívoros neotropicais. In 'Manejo e conservação de carnívoros neotropicais'. (Eds. RG Morato, FHG Rodrigues, E Eizirik, PR Mangini, FCC Azavedo and J Marinho-Filho) pp. 229–244. (Instituto Brasileiro do Meio Ambiente e dos Recursos Naturais Renováveis (IBAMA): Brasilia, Distrito Federal)
Spindler R. E., Songsasen, N. and Deem, S.L. 2007 Factors affecting the reproductive success of jaguars, in Manejo e Conservação de Carnivoros Neotropicais.  Eds RG Morato, FHG Rodrigues, E Eizirik, PR Mangini, FCC Azavedo and J Marinho-Filho pp. 281–304. Instituto Brasileiro do Meio Ambiente e dos Recursos Naturais Renováveis (IBAMA): Brasilia, Distrito Federal
Spindler R.E. and D.E. Wildt.  2010. Male reproduction: assessment, management, assisted breeding and fertility control, in Wild Mammals in Captivity 2nd Ed (eds., D.G. Kleiman, K.V. Thompson, and S. Lumpkin). University of Chicago Press, Chicago, IL.
Spindler, R.E., Wiszniewski, J and Slip, D.  (2012) The Potential Role of Zoos in Climate Change, in Climate Change.  Eds, D Lunney and P Hutchins.  Royal Zoological Society Publications.
Spindler RE and Wiszniewski 2013. Research in Zoos In "Zoo Keeping: An Introduction to the Science and Technology". MD Irwin, JB Stoner, AM Cobaugh (eds) University of Chicago Press. 
Spindler RE, Keeley T and Satake N 2014. Applied Andrology in Endangered, Exotic and Wildlife Species. In "Animal Andrology: Theories and Applications". P Chenoweth and S Lorton (eds) CABI publishing.

References

Australian zoologists
Australian women scientists
University of Melbourne alumni
Scientists from Melbourne
Living people
Year of birth missing (living people)